Mulena Yomuhulu Mbumu wa Litunga Mwananyanda Liwale was a King of Barotseland in Zambia, very unpopular ruler.

Biography

Family
Mwananyanda was the second son of the King Mwanawina I and grandson of Prince Mbanga and Princess Notulu.

His brothers were Prince Yutuluwakaole and King Mulambwa Santulu, who succeeded him.

He had a son, Prince Mwanang'ono, who was a candidate for the succession.

Reign
Mwananyanda Liwale succeeded his father.

Queen Notulu was killed on his order, being starved to death.

He was killed by Mwanamatia, 4th Chief of Nalolo.

References

Litungas
1812 deaths
Year of birth unknown